Ernest Barry (born 1 July 1967 in Malta) is a former professional footballer who played as a goalkeeper, he was most recently player/goalkeeper coach for Floriana in the Maltese Football League.

External links
 Ernest Barry at MaltaFootball.com
 

1967 births
Living people
Maltese footballers
Naxxar Lions F.C. players
Melita F.C. players
Sliema Wanderers F.C. players
St. George's F.C. players
Pietà Hotspurs F.C. players
Valletta F.C. players
Balzan F.C. players
Floriana F.C. players
Association football goalkeepers
Malta international footballers